Inga approximata is a species of plant in the family Fabaceae. It is found only in Bolivia.

References

approximata
Flora of Bolivia
Vulnerable plants
Taxonomy articles created by Polbot